Tang Tian ( born on March 3, 1977, in Dalian) is a Chinese football coach and a former professional footballer who previously played as a defender.

Club career
Tang Tian initially started his career with second-tier football club Changchun Yatai, but by the 2000 Chinese league season he could not establish himself within the team and would leave the club. He revived his career with top-tier club Bayi Football Team and went on to establish himself as a regular within the team until the end of the 2003 league season when the club were relegated. With the club unable to cope with the relegation they disbanded and Tang was allowed to find a new club in top-tier team Dalian Shide who he joined the following season. At Dalian he could not establish himself as a regular and he soon joined second-tier club Shanghai The 9 for a season. Tang would return to Dalian and during his second stint he would gain more playing time until he left at the end of the 2008 league season. He would then have a stint at top-tier club Jiangsu Sainty before going to the Indonesia Super League for a short time where he joined Persipura Jayapura.

References

External links

1977 births
Living people
Footballers from Dalian
Chinese footballers
Changchun Yatai F.C. players
Bayi Football Team players
Dalian Shide F.C. players
Jiangsu F.C. players
Persipura Jayapura players
Chinese expatriate footballers
Chinese expatriate sportspeople in Indonesia
Expatriate footballers in Indonesia
Liga 1 (Indonesia) players
Chinese Super League players
Association football defenders
Shanghai Shenhua F.C. non-playing staff